The McCourt School of Public Policy is one of ten constituent schools of Georgetown University. The McCourt School offers master's degrees in public policy, international development policy, policy management, data science for public policy, and policy leadership as well as administers several professional certificate programs and houses fifteen affiliated research centers. The McCourt School has twenty-one full-time faculty members, ten visiting faculty members, more than one-hundred adjunct faculty members and approximately 450 enrolled students across the various degree and executive education programs.

The school is based in Old North, the oldest academic building on Georgetown University's main campus. Formerly known as the Georgetown Public Policy Institute (GPPI), the McCourt School became Georgetown University's ninth school in October 2013 as a result of a $100 million gift from Georgetown University alumnus Frank McCourt.

The school is led by Maria Cancian, whose research focuses on public policy and family wellbeing. Cancian was preceded by Michael A. Bailey, who led the school as interim dean from 2017 to 2019. Bailey was preceded by Edward B. Montgomery, who became Dean of GPPI in August 2010. Montgomery was preceded by interim Dean William T. Gormley.

History

Establishing a public policy school in Washington, D.C. originated as an idea in the Georgetown University Department of Government and Economics in the late 1970s.

In 1980, the Government Department instituted a certificate program and in 1982 hired two junior faculty members to teach courses in public policy.  For the next five years, the Public Policy Program expanded, granting a master's degree program in government with a concentration in public policy to approximately 15 students.  In 1985, the Government Department hired the first part-time director to help establish the framework for the Public Policy Program.  By the late 1980s, enrollment in the program had grown to about 75 students.

In 1990, the new president of Georgetown University, Father Leo O'Donovan, S.J., prioritized the expansion of the Public Policy Program under the direction of the program's first full-time director, Colin Campbell S.J., a Georgetown professor of philosophy and politics.  Dr. Campbell was charged with the task of significantly expanding the program's faculty, students, and facilities.

In 1996 the Public Policy Program was renamed the Georgetown Public Policy Institute.

Dr. Judy Feder was appointed dean in 2001. Faculty, applications, enrollment, staff, and facilities all grew under Dr. Feder's tenure. Most notably, three master's degree programs were added to the school: Master of Policy Management degree for mid-career students in 2001, MPM-Public Service (MPM-PS) for students from government agencies in 2004, and an evening program to supplement the traditional Masters of Public Policy (MPP).

In 2013, the university announced a $100 million gift—the largest single gift in Georgetown University history—from alumnus Frank McCourt (C’75) for the establishment of the McCourt School of Public Policy, Georgetown's ninth school, and their first new one since the McDonough School of Business was formed in 1957.

Under the leadership of current Dean Edward B. Montgomery, The McCourt School launched its first year in October 2013 and enrolled its first students in the Master of International Development Policy (MIDP) program in the fall of 2012. The McCourt School launched the Executive Master in Public Policy Leadership in 2014.

In 2021, Frank McCourt donated an additional $100 million to the school, half of which is to be used to fund faculty and research and the other half of which will support financial aid.

Academics

Master of Public Policy Degree
The Master of Public Policy (MPP) is a 48 credit hour program offered as both a two-year full-time and three year evening program. The program's focus is designed to meet the needs of individuals desiring a strong analytical background, particularly those planning careers in public or private sector policy analysis and management.

Dual degrees
For the MPP degree, MSPP offers dual degree programs with Georgetown Law Center, McDonough School of Business, Walsh School of Foreign Service, and the Graduate School of Arts and Sciences, as well as with the University of Geneva, and HEC Paris:
Master of Public Policy/Master of Business Administration (MPP/MBA)
Master of Public Policy/PhD in government (MPP/PhD)
Master of Public Policy/PhD in psychology (MPP/PhD)
Master of Public Policy/Juris Doctor (MPP/JD)
Master of Public Policy/ Master of Science in foreign service (MPP/MS)
Master of Public Policy/ Master of Arts in German and European studies (MPP/MA)
Master of Public Policy/International Organizations MBA (MPP/IOMBA)
Master of Public Policy/Master in Management (MPP/MiM)

Master of International Development Policy
The Master of International Development Policy (MIDP) is a 48-credit degree program. The curriculum of the program teaches the quantitative skills needed to formulate policy solutions with a focus on politics, management, and ethics of development.

Master of Policy Management Degree
The Master of Policy Management (MPM) is a 36-credit hour mid-career degree program focused on analytics, management, and substance within specific policy areas. The Program is designed for policy professionals with five to seven years of substantial policy and/or management experience.

Executive Master in Policy Leadership
The 30-credit Executive Master of Policy Leadership (EMPL) equips policy professionals with the knowledge and leadership skills necessary to advance to senior leadership and executive level positions. The curriculum is designed with special attention to the Executive Core Qualifications (ECQs) for the Senior Executive Service (SES). The EMPL is delivered in a 5-day executive format.

Non-credit certificates
Certificate in Educational Leadership and Management is a non-credit professional development certificate designed to help local and state education officials support and lead improvement efforts.

Customized executive education
These are customized training programs in a variety of topics: international and domestic public policy issue areas; Congress and the executive branch; leadership and management; program evaluation and quantitative methods; writing for public policy; political organizing and influence; as well as other topics.

International programs
MSPP offers a number of global learning opportunities including a dual degree with the University of Geneva, five study abroad options, a Spring Break immersion experience, and a sustainable development project.
University of Geneva, Switzerland
HEC Paris, Paris, France
The Hertie School of Governance, Berlin, Germany
Fudan University, Shanghai, China (in collaboration with Queen's University, Ontario, Canada)
Lee Kuan Yew School of Public Policy, National University of Singapore

Faculty
The McCourt School consists of 20 core faculty members, 10 visiting faculty members, and more than 100 adjunct faculty members. A 2010 report by the Women in Public Policy group at the Goldman School of Public Policy found that of 10 leading public policy schools, that MSPP ranked #1 in the overall percent of tenured and tenure track faculty that are women (about 40 percent).

Rankings
The 2017 U.S. News & World Report ranking of graduate programs in public affairs ranked The McCourt School in the 90th percentile of all programs in the nation at 25th, tied with University of Ohio, and UNC-Chapel Hill, among others. MSPP ranked first in the Washington, D.C., area in the specialty area of Social Policy at 20th; the school also ranked 15th in Health Policy and Management, and 15th in Public Policy Analysis. The McCourt School is not ranked by the National Research Council because it does not have a doctoral program.

Student organizations
Georgetown Public Policy Student Association: The Georgetown Public Policy Student Association (GPPSA) is the student government of MSPP. GPPSA facilitates communication among students, administration and faculty; organizes academic, professional, social, and community service initiatives; and provides support and funding for MSPP student organizations.
The Latin American Policy Association (LAPA): The Latin American Policy Association (LAPA) was developed in the Spring of 2015. The Latin American Policy Association seeks to disseminate knowledge and awareness about Latin American issues and policies among the McCourt School community, in addition to advancing the interests of Latin American students in the McCourt School and in the larger Georgetown community.
McCourt School Policy Conference: Each year, MSPP students work together to plan an annual public policy conference. The event brings distinguished academics and policymakers to Washington, D.C., to discuss the most pressing and complex social issues of the day.
Georgetown Public Policy Review: The Georgetown Public Policy Review (GPPR) is MSPP's nonpartisan, student-run peer-reviewed academic journal. Approximately 50 staff members work to produce and promote this print publication, The Georgetown Public Policy Review as well as an online blog, GPPR Online.
McCourt Policy in Practice: Since 2007, MSPP students have worked to develop a relationship with the residents of Roatán, Honduras. Four groups of students have now traveled to the island of Roatán over Spring Break to implement ongoing service and development projects. McCourt Policy in Practice (MPiP) used to be known as Project Honduras. In the last year, MPiP has also performed social projects in Cabarete, a small town in the Dominican Republic, along with different non-profit organizations focused in educations and health policy.
Public Policy OUT: Public Policy OUT (P-POUT) is the MSPP LGBT policy issue group. This includes both national and local policy issues, as well as issues facing LGBT individuals working in policy-focused careers. The group focuses specifically on education, networking, outreach, and awareness.
EduWonks: EduWonks is Georgetown's premier education policy student organization. EduWonks facilitates policy dialogue, professional growth experiences, and interdisciplinary collaboration through our speaker events, policy chats, and service initiatives in the DC community. Notable events in the 2016–2017 academic year included Kaya Henderson, chancellor of DC Public Schools, and a yearlong policy thesis mentoring program with Cesar Chavez PCS. In the coming years EduWonks plans to diversify their speaker series, increase the reach and impact of their service initiatives, and create a comprehensive database of recommended internships and alumni contacts in the education sector.
Women in Public Policy Initiative: MSPP's Women in Public Policy Initiative (WPPI) is dedicated to developing exceptional female leaders in public policy and increasing awareness of issues that disproportionately affect women and girls through strategic partnerships, service, and advocacy.
McCourt Energy and Environmental group (McCourt E&E):
East Asian Policy Association: East Asian Policy Association (EAPA) aims to create a platform engaging McCourt students in discussions related to East Asian policies and political issues.
South Asian Policy and Research Initiative: The South Asian Policy and Research Initiative (SAPRI) is a student-led initiative dedicated to raising awareness on the critical development challenges facing economies in South Asia and promoting evidence-based policies in the region.

Research centers, projects and organizations
The McCourt School's affiliated centers are engaged in research, professional training, and sharing of information on Congress, health policies, and social policies.
Institute of Politics and Public Service (GU Politics): Partake in the study of politics and the political process and engage in student-driven conversations with elected officials, policymakers, members of the media, and others.
The Government Affairs Institute (GAI):  The Government Affairs Institute provides education and training about congressional processes, organization, and practices, and about selected legislative policy issues.
The Georgetown University Initiative on Innovation, Development and Evaluation (GUI²DE).
The Health Policy Institute: HPI is a multi-disciplinary group of faculty and staff conducting research on key issues in health policy and health services research, including health care financing, the uninsured, and health insurance reform.
Center for Children and Families: CCF is an independent, nonpartisan policy and research center whose mission is to expand and improve health coverage for America's children and families.
Center on Health Insurance Reforms (CHIR)
National Center for Education in Maternal and Child Health
National Maternal and Child Oral Health Resource Center (OHRC): OHRC supports health professionals, program administration and staff, educators, policymakers, and others working in states and communities with the goal of improving oral health services for infants, children, adolescents, and their families.
Health Information Group: The Health Information Group provides leadership in program development, educational resources, and innovative technology to improve health and well-being.
The Center on Education and the Workforce: The center is an independent, nonprofit research and policy institute that studies the link between education, career qualifications, and workforce demands. The center conducts research, engagement, and outreach to policymakers and practitioners.
The Center for Juvenile Justice Reform (CJJR): CJJR advances a balanced, multi-systems approach to reducing juvenile delinquency that promotes positive child and youth development, while also holding youth accountable.
The Center on Poverty, Inequality, & Public Policy: The Center on Poverty works with policymakers, researchers, advocates, and others to develop effective policies and practices to alleviate poverty and inequality in the United States. The center's areas of anti-poverty work include: developing effective workforce and education policies and programs; improving outcomes for disadvantaged and disconnected youth; and expanding and improving the Earned Income Tax Credit and other federal poverty-reduction programs.
The Center for Public and Nonprofit Leadership (CPNL): CPNL is an education, research and training center dedicated to the development of public, nonprofit and philanthropic leadership.
The Center for Research on Children in the United States (CROCUS): CROCUS focuses on policy issues related to children, including early childhood education, pre-K programs, Head Start, and child care programs.
Edunomics Lab: Edunomics Lab is a research center exploring and modeling complex education fiscal decisions. The center tracks public funds in K-12 and higher education systems to the point of service and examines the effects of policy decisions on  the allocation of resources across students and services

List of deans

References

External links
 Official site

School of Public Policy
Public administration schools in the United States
Public policy schools